The Pocasset Gymnasium, in Pocasset, Oklahoma, was built as a Works Progress Administration project in 1940. It was listed on the National Register of Historic Places in 1996.

It is a  building designed by architect Walter T. Vahlberg.  It, along with renovations to school buildings in Pocasset, was to be funded by a WPA grant of 17,720 dollars and Pocasset School Board funds of 10,990 dollars, under a voter-approved bond.

It is located at the intersection of Adams St. and 6th St. in Pocasset.

References

Gyms in the United States
National Register of Historic Places in Grady County, Oklahoma
Buildings and structures completed in 1940